The 1963–64 Regionalliga  was the inaugural Regionalliga season. The league operated in five regional divisions, Berlin, North, South, Southwest and West. The five league champions and the runners-up from the west, south, southwest and north then entered a promotion play-off to determine the two clubs to move up to the Bundesliga for the next season. Southwest champions Borussia Neunkirchen and northern runners-up Hannover 96 were promoted.

Regionalliga Nord

Table
The inaugural 1963–64 season saw 18 clubs in the league, the 13 clubs from the Oberliga Nord that did not qualify for the Bundesliga and five from the Northern German Amateurligas.

Results

Regionalliga Berlin
The inaugural 1963–64 season saw ten clubs in the league, seven clubs from the Oberliga Berlin and three from the Amateurliga Berlin.

Regionalliga West

Table
The inaugural 1963–64 season saw 20 clubs in the league, the eleven clubs from the Oberliga West that did not qualify for the Bundesliga, eight from the 2. Oberliga West and one club from the Verbandsliga Westfalen, the Lüner SV.

Results

Regionalliga Südwest
The inaugural 1963–64 season saw 20 clubs in the league, the 14 clubs from the Oberliga Südwest that did not qualify for the Bundesliga and six from the 2. Oberliga Südwest.

Regionalliga Süd
The inaugural 1963–64 season saw 20 clubs in the league, the eleven clubs from the Oberliga Süd that did not qualify for the Bundesliga and nine from the 2. Oberliga Süd.

Promotion playoffs

Decider
The runners-up of the Regionalliga West and Regionalliga Südwest played a two-leg decider to determined which team qualified for the group stage, which FK Pirmasens won on aggregate.

Group 1

Table

Results

Group 2

Table

Results

External links
Regionalliga on the official DFB website 
kicker 

1963-64
2
Ger